The Moonshine Feud is a 1920 American silent Western film starring Texas Guinan. An abridged 1929 rerelease version is preserved.

Cast
 Texas Guinan

References

External links
 The Moonshine Feud at IMDb.com

1920 films
1920 Western (genre) films
American silent short films
American black-and-white films
Silent American Western (genre) films
1920s American films
1920s English-language films